Jansch is a surname. Notable people with the surname include:

Bert Jansch (1943–2011), Scottish folk musician
Heather Jansch (born 1948), British sculptor